William M. Charter, nicknamed "Babe", is an American former Negro league first baseman who played in the 1940s.

Charter made his Negro leagues debut in 1943 with the Birmingham Black Barons, Kansas City Monarchs, and Chicago American Giants. He went on to play two more seasons with Chicago through 1946.

References

External links
 and Seamheads

Year of birth missing
Place of birth missing
Birmingham Black Barons players
Chicago American Giants players
Kansas City Monarchs players
Baseball first basemen